Bois-le-Roi station is a railway station in Bois-le-Roi, Île-de-France, France. The station is at kilometric point (KP) 50.896 on the Paris–Marseille railway line. The station is served by TER (local) services operated by SNCF. The station is served by Transilien line R (Paris-Gare de Lyon). The station was designed by the architect François-Alexis Cendrier, one of many he worked on for the railroad company Chemins de fer de Paris à Lyon et à la Méditerranée.

Train services
The following services currently call at Bois-le-Roi:
local service (TER Bourgogne-Franche-Comté) Paris–Montereau–Sens–Laroche-Migennes
local service (Transilien R) Paris–Melun–Montereau

Gallery

See also
Transilien Paris–Lyon

References

External links

 
Transilien network map
Transilien website

Railway stations in Seine-et-Marne
Railway stations in France opened in 1849